Hey World is the fifth album by American country music singer Lee Brice. It was released on November 20, 2020 via Curb Records.

Content
Brice confirmed the album's track listing in September 2020. The album's release was preceded by the two singles "One of Them Girls" and "Memory I Don't Mess With". Also included on the album is "I Hope You're Happy Now", a duet with Carly Pearce from the latter's self-titled album. The Voice contestant Blessing Offor sings duet vocals on the title track.

Critical reception
Rating it 3.5 out of 5 stars, Stephen Thomas Erlewine of AllMusic found the album to contain more stylistic variety than its predecessors. He also said of Brice that "he wears his impending middle age quite well, proving that even if he's changing his fashions, what looks best on him is something with a little heart."

Track listing

Personnel
Adapted from liner notes.

Lee Brice - dobro, acoustic guitar, electric guitar, keyboards, lead vocals, background vocals
busbee - acoustic guitar
Chris DeStefano - background vocals
Kris Donegan - acoustic guitar, baritone guitar, electric guitar
Ian Fitchuk - keyboards
Paul Franklin - lap steel guitar
Ben Glover - acoustic guitar, baritone guitar, electric guitar, keyboards, programming, background vocals
Mark Hill - bass guitar
Kyle Jacobs - acoustic guitar, background vocals
Ben Johnson - programming
Mike Leach - keyboards
Josh Matheny - dobro
Jerry McPherson - dobro, acoustic guitar, electric guitar
Gordon Mote - keyboards
Blessing Offor - duet vocals on "Hey World"
Carly Pearce - duet vocals on "I Hope You're Happy Now"
Paul Rippee - bass guitar
Jerry Roe - drums
Jimmie Lee Sloas - bass guitar
Aaron Sterling - drums
Ilya Toshinsky - acoustic guitar
Derek Wells - acoustic guitar, baritone guitar, electric guitar
Fred Williams - keyboards, programming
Nir Z. - drums

Charts

Weekly charts

Year-end charts

Certifications

References

2020 albums
Curb Records albums
Lee Brice albums